Sana'a's Mosques are unique in architecture, and history, they adopted the South Arabian Architecture, unlike the old mosques, the modern mosques are usually built on Modern Arabic Architecture

Rashidunids
Great Mosque of Sana'a

Modern
Al Khair Mosque, Sana'a
Al Saleh Mosque
Al Shohada Mosque (Sana'a)

Unknown
Alansar Mosque
Albolaily Mosque
Alemaan Mosque
Hanthel Mosque
Tahla Mosque (Qubbat Tahla)

 
Sana'a
Mosques